Brachelia is a genus of bristle flies in the family Tachinidae. There are at least three described species in Brachelia.

Species
These three species belong to the genus Brachelia:
 Brachelia leocrates (Walker, 1849) c g
 Brachelia minor Mesnil, 1968 c g
 Brachelia westermanni (Wiedemann, 1819) c g
Data sources: i = ITIS, c = Catalogue of Life, g = GBIF, b = Bugguide.net

References

Further reading

External links

 
 

Tachinidae